Brian McKenzie is a former Australian rules footballer who played with Collingwood in the Victorian Football League (VFL).

Notes

External links 

1947 births
Australian rules footballers from Victoria (Australia)
Collingwood Football Club players
Terang Football Club players
Living people